Minseito is the name for two Japanese political parties:

 Rikken Minseito, an important party in pre-World War II Japan (1927–1940)
 Good Governance Party, a reformist party that existed for a few months in 1998